Robert Reed Gailey (November 26, 1869 – January 18, 1950) was an American college football player and coach. He served as the head football coach at Washington Agricultural College and School of Science—now known as Washington State University—for one season in 1897, compiling a record of 2–0.

Gailey was born in Fawn Grove, Pennsylvania. He graduated from Lafayette College in 1895 and subsequently earned a Master of Arts degree from Princeton University and a Bachelor of Divinity from the Princeton Theological Seminary. At Princeton, he played football in 1896, earning All-American honors playing at center. Gailey later founded the world service program of the YMCA of the USA. He died on January 18, 1950, at his home in Pasadena, California.

Head coaching record

References

1869 births
1950 deaths
19th-century players of American football
All-American college football players
Princeton Tigers football players
Washington State Cougars football coaches
YMCA leaders
Lafayette College alumni
Princeton Theological Seminary alumni
People from York County, Pennsylvania